Blanc or le Blanc is a surname of French origin, meaning White. Notable people with the surname include:

 Adolphe-Edmond Blanc (1799-1850), French politician
 Antoine Blanc (1792–1860), first Archbishop of New Orleans
 Antoine le Blanc (19th century), French immigrant to the United States, celebrated murderer
 Bertrand Blanc (b. 1973), French ski mountaineer
 Charles Blanc (1813-1882), French art critic
 Didier Blanc (b. 1984), French ski mountaineer
 Edmond Blanc (1856-1920), French politician
 Erika Blanc (b. 1942), Italian actress
 Ernest Blanc (1923–2010), opera singer
 Frédéric Blanc (born 1967), French composer, organist and improvisor
 Georges Blanc (pilot) (1887-1960), French World War I flying ace
 Henri Blanc (zoologist) (1859–1930), Swiss zoologist
 Jacques Blanc (b. 1939), French politician
 Jennifer Blanc (b. 1974), American actress
 Julien Blanc (b. 1988), Dating coach, self-help speaker
 Laurent Blanc (b. 1965), French manager and former footballer
 Louis Blanc (1811–1882), French politician and historian
 Marie-Félix Blanc (1859–1882), French heiress
 Martine Blanc (b. 1944), French children's book author and illustrator
 Mel Blanc (1908–1989), American voice actor of Looney Tunes and Merrie Melodies
 Michel Blanc (b. 1952), French actor
 Patrick Blanc (b. 1953), French botanist
 Patrick Blanc (ski mountaineer), (b. 1972), French ski mountaineer
 Raymond Blanc (b. 1949), French chef
 Samuel Oscar Blanc, invented the Roto-Rooter drain-cleaning machine
 Serge Blanc (footballer) (born 1972), French footballer
 Serge Blanc (violinist) (1929–2013), French violinist, conductor and academic
 Sophie Blanc (born 1968), French politician

See also
 Le Blanc (real name Emilia), the Deceiver, a playable champion character in the multiplayer online battle arena video game League of Legends
 Blanc, a fictional character in the game Hyperdimension Neptunia
 blanc, a BL manga by Asumiko Nakamura and sequel to Classmates

French-language surnames